|}

The Epsom Dash is a flat handicap horse race in Great Britain open to horses aged three years or older. It is run at Epsom over a distance of 5 furlongs (1,006 metres), and it is scheduled to take place each year in early June.

The Epsom five furlongs course, which is downhill until the last 100 yards, is reputed to be the fastest of its kind in the world.  The current world record for five furlongs, 53.69 seconds, was set  by Stone of Folca in this race in 2012.

The race was known as the Night Rider Handicap until 1993.

Winners since 1988

See also 
Horse racing in Great Britain
List of British flat horse races

References

 Paris-Turf:

Racing Post:

Flat races in Great Britain
Epsom Downs Racecourse
Open sprint category horse races